Laura Ann Branigan (July 3, 1952 – August 26, 2004) was an American singer, songwriter, and actress. Her signature song, the platinum-certified 1982 single "Gloria", stayed on the U.S. Billboard Hot 100 for 36 weeks, then a record for a female artist, peaking at No. 2. It also reached number one in Australia and Canada. Branigan's "Gloria" was a cover of a song written by Italian singer-songwriters Giancarlo Bigazzi and Umberto Tozzi. In 1984, she reached number one in Canada and Germany with the U.S. No. 4 hit "Self Control", which was released by Italian singer and songwriter Raf the same year. Both "Gloria" and "Self Control" were successful in the United Kingdom, making the Top 10 in the UK Singles Chart.

Seeing her greatest level of success in the 1980s, Branigan's other singles included the Top 10 hit "Solitaire" (1983), the US Adult Contemporary Chart number one "How Am I Supposed to Live Without You" (1983), the Australian No. 2 hit "Ti amo" (1984),  her return to the top 40 "The Power of Love" (1987), and "Shattered Glass" (1987), which reached the top 15 of the U.S. dance chart. Her most successful studio album was 1984's platinum-selling Self Control. She also contributed songs to motion picture and television soundtracks, including the Grammy and Academy Award-winning Flashdance soundtrack (1983), the Ghostbusters soundtrack (1984), and Miami Vice (1984). In 1985, she won the Tokyo Music Festival with the song "The Lucky One".

Her chart success began to wane as the decade closed and after her last two studio albums Laura Branigan (1990) and Over My Heart (1993) garnered little attention, she generally retired from public life for the rest of the 1990s. She returned to performing in the early 2000s, most notably appearing as Janis Joplin in the off-Broadway musical Love, Janis. As she was recording new music and preparing a comeback to the music industry, she died at her home in August 2004 from a previously undiagnosed cerebral aneurysm.

Branigan and her music saw renewed popularity and public interest in 2019 in the US after "Gloria" was adopted by the NHL's St. Louis Blues as their unofficial victory song while they completed a historic mid-season turnaround to win their first Stanley Cup in franchise history, leading to the song entering ice hockey lore as an "unlikely championship anthem". Branigan's legacy manager and representative Kathy Golik embraced the trend and traveled to St. Louis to publicly represent Branigan among the Blues fanbase during the 2019 Stanley Cup Playoffs, later stating her belief that Branigan and "Gloria" "will forever be intertwined" with the Blues and the city of St. Louis.

Biography

1952–1970: Early life
Laura Ann Branigan was born on July 3, 1952, in Mount Kisco, New York, near New York City, the fourth of five children born to Irish-American parents Kathleen O'Hare Branigan and James Branigan Sr., an account executive and mutual funds broker; they later separated. Branigan's maternal grandparents were William O'Hare Jr. (son of William John O'Hare and Agnes B. O'Connor) and Mary Conway (daughter of Francis J. Conway and Mary Teresa McGuiness). 

Branigan was raised in Armonk, New York, and as a child attended a Catholic school in nearby Chappaqua. She attended Byram Hills High School from 1966 to 1970, starring in the high school musical The Pajama Game in her senior year.

Between 1970 and 1972, Branigan attended the American Academy of Dramatic Arts in New York City, and supported herself by working as a waitress.

1972–1980: Career beginnings
In 1972, Branigan met acoustic guitarist Walker Daniels and his future wife Sharon Storm, and acoustic guitarist Chris Van Cleave, forming the folk-rock band Meadow. In 1973 the group, with bass player Bob Valdez, released their debut album The Friend Ship, featuring the singles "When You Were Young", and "Cane and Able", which featured the hook line "Throw away your cane and you are able". The record was not properly promoted and never re-released. The band broke up, after which Walker Daniels committed suicide. Branigan preferred not to discuss her involvement with Meadow publicly.

During the years after Meadow broke up, Branigan had various jobs, including a stint as one of Leonard Cohen's backup singers for his European tour in April–August 1976.

Branigan met attorney Larry Ross Kruteck (1936–1996) at a party in Manhattan in 1978, and they married in December of that year. He died of colon cancer on June 15, 1996.

In 1979, after a chance meeting with manager Sid Bernstein on her return from Europe, Branigan was signed by Ahmet Ertegun to Atlantic Records. For several years Atlantic had difficulty classifying Branigan's powerful voice. Her pop single "Looking Out for Number One", from her unreleased album Silver Dreams, made a brief appearance on the U.S. dance chart, reaching No. 60. Two other early Atlantic singles, "Tell Him" and "Fool's Affair", followed. None of these three singles (or the B-side, "When") were included on her first album, but all four songs were eventually released on CD over 30 years later in 2014 as bonus cuts on a U.S. CD reissue of Branigan's first album.

Branigan's 9-track debut album, Branigan, was released in March 1982. The first single from the album was "All Night with Me", which reached No. 69 on the Billboard charts in early 1982. The album alternated four energetic up-tempo songs with five ballads, including one of the few songs written solely by Branigan, "I Wish We Could Be Alone". "Gloria", an Italian love song recorded in 1979 by Umberto Tozzi and successful in several European countries, was released as the album's second single. Branigan's version was reworked with Tozzi's own arranger, Greg Mathieson, who updated its production with fellow producer Jack White to give it what Branigan called "an American kick" to match the new English lyrics. U.S. radio stations were initially unreceptive to "Gloria", but after it was embraced by dance clubs it eventually won them over, becoming one of the biggest hits of the 1980s. The album went gold, and the single was eventually certified platinum (sales of more than two million U.S. copies). Branigan's performance of "Gloria" was nominated for a Grammy Award for Best Female Pop Vocal Performance alongside Linda Ronstadt, Olivia Newton-John, Juice Newton and that year's winner, Melissa Manchester, becoming her only solo nomination. 

In the spring of 1983, Branigan released her second album Branigan 2. Her vocals propelled her English-language version of the French song, "Solitaire" toward the top of the U.S. charts. The original "Solitaire" was written and recorded in 1981 by French singer-songwriter Martine Clemenceau. Two songs included on the album began the careers for two then-unknowns: the English translation of "Solitaire" was the first major hit for songwriter Diane Warren, while the ballad "How Am I Supposed to Live Without You" was the first major hit for its co-writer, Michael Bolton. Branigan's version reached No. 12 on the hot 100 and spent three weeks at No. 1 on the Billboard adult contemporary chart.

1981–1989: Mainstream success 

During the height of her career, Branigan also made acting appearances, first in 1981 in An American Girl in Berlin for West German television, and then after the success of "Gloria", guest appearances on American television series such as CHiPs ("Fox Trap", season 6, episode 16, in which she played Sarah, lead singer of the female rock band Cadillac Foxes), Automan and Knight Rider. She would later appear in independent films including Mugsy's Girls (aka Delta Pi, 1985) with Oscar-winner Ruth Gordon, and the Australian film Backstage. She sang on major national television and radio campaigns for products including Dr Pepper, Coca-Cola and Chrysler, which sponsored her 1985–1986 "Hold Me" tour.

The year 1984, while she was working with German producer Jack White, was the height of the European synthpop era, and "Self Control", the title track of Branigan's third album, released in April 1984 became her biggest hit internationally, topping the charts in over six countries, most notably West Germany, where it spent six weeks at No. 1.  The original version was recorded a few months earlier, still in 1984, under the name of one of the song's co-writers "Raf" (Raffaele Riefoli), and held the West German number 2 spot during this time period; Branigan's version enjoyed more success outside of Raf's native Italy, hitting No. 4 in the U.S. The song was featured on the eighth episode of the first season of the TV series, Miami Vice, entitled "The Great McCarthy", which aired on November 16, 1984. Other pop, disco, and adult contemporary hits from the Self Control album include "The Lucky One" (which won her a Tokyo Music Festival prize), the continental ballad "Ti Amo" (another Umberto Tozzi hit, and a No. 2 hit in Australia for Branigan) and the dance hit "Satisfaction". The album also featured an understated version of Carole King's "Will You Still Love Me Tomorrow"; as a counterpoint to all the dance productions, it was a bare-bones piano version. (In concerts and television appearances throughout her career, Branigan accompanied herself on the piano for the song.)

Also during 1984, Branigan contributed the song "Hot Night" to the Ghostbusters soundtrack. The song was written by Diane Warren and The Doctor.

Branigan's vocal coach was Carlo Menotti, and she worked with Steve Lukather (Toto), Dann Huff (Giant) and Michael Landau; keyboardists Greg Mathieson, Harold Faltermeyer, Michael Boddicker and Robbie Buchanan; bassists Nathan East and Dennis Belfield (Rufus); drummers Carlos Vega and Doane Perry (Jethro Tull); percussionists Paulinho Da Costa and Lenny Castro; and guest vocalists including Joe "Bean" Esposito and background vocalists including The Waters Sisters (Maxine and Julia), James Ingram, and Richard Page and Stephen George (Mr. Mister).  As her stature grew, she attracted Grammy-winning producers including Phil Ramone, Richard Perry and David Kershenbaum. She performed duets with John Farnham as well as Latin pop artist Luis Miguel.

In 1984, Branigan's live show was recorded twice, for a syndicated radio concert series and a concert video.  Branigan was also nominated for an award at the American Music Awards of 1985 for favorite pop/rock female video artist, won by Cyndi Lauper. Also in 1985, Branigan performed the main theme song for the television mini-series Hollywood Wives, based on the novel by Jackie Collins.

By the time Branigan's fourth album, Hold Me was released in July 1985, "Self Control" was a worldwide success. The hits continued with "Spanish Eddie", which was her sixth U.S. Billboard top 40 pop hit in two and a half years. The subsequent single release "Hold Me" was a U.S. top-40 dance hit, and Branigan's introduction of the rock ballad "I Found Someone" (co-written by Michael Bolton, a later hit for Cher) scored even higher on the adult contemporary chart. However, neither song was supported by a music video, and both stalled at the low end of the Hot 100 chart. On June 13, 1985, Branigan made her fourth appearance on legendary TV music show American Bandstand, performing "Spanish Eddie" and "Hold Me".
In February 1986, Branigan was invited for the first time to XXVII Festival Internacional De La Canción De Viña Del Mar in Chile, having a successful performance on the main stage and by television and thus increasing its popularity both in Chile and in the rest of Latin America.

Branigan's fifth album, Touch (released July 7, 1987) marked a change in her career. Under new management and using different producers, Branigan took a more active role in her work and in the studio, seeing her return to dancefloors with the Stock-Aitken-Waterman-produced track "Shattered Glass", written by Bob Mitchell and Steve Coe, of the band Monsoon. "Shattered Glass" was performed by Branigan on the last episode of American Bandstand (hosted by Dick Clark) to be broadcast on ABC (the show would last for two more years, first in first-run syndication and finally on the USA Network) on September 5, 1987, becoming their last guest performer. The album also included a return to the Billboard top-40 with her cover of Jennifer Rush's "Power of Love", which was one of the 20 bestselling singles in the U.S. during the Christmas season. The album's third single, "Cry Wolf", a top-30 AC hit, did not capture the attention of pop radio stations and stalled; the ballad was recorded two years later by Stevie Nicks, and more recently by its writer Jude Johnstone.

1990–2000: Later career and hiatus
Branigan's sixth album, Laura Branigan (1990), brought her back to the Hi-NRG charts and gay clubs with "Moonlight on Water", and she scored a top-30 adult contemporary hit with "Never in a Million Years". Branigan added production to her list of credits with her cover of Vicki Sue Robinson's disco-era "Turn the Beat Around" and the atmospheric "Let Me In", a cover of an Eddie Money song. The album also includes '"Unison", which was the title track for Céline Dion's English debut CD in the same year. The album's closing track, a cover of Bryan Adams' "The Best Was Yet to Come", was produced and arranged by Branigan. The 1990–1991 Laura Branigan Tour, which was kicked off with an appearance on The Tonight Show Starring Johnny Carson on July 13, 1990 was followed by a performance in the Trump Regency Showroom in Atlantic City, New Jersey on July 14, and filmed for a syndicated U.S. television show SRO in Concert, which was released on videocassette and laserdisc; on July 15, 1990, she performed at the Warwick Musical Theatre in Rhode Island.
On Branigan's seventh and final studio album Over My Heart (August 17, 1993), the singer again produced (with Phil Ramone), and wrote and arranged. It included "Didn't We Almost Win It All" (by Branigan and Brian BecVar) (released as the first single), a cover of Cher's song "Hard Enough Getting Over You" (released as the second single), a cover of the Patty Loveless single "How Can I Help You Say Goodbye", a cover of Roxette's song "The Sweet Hello, The Sad Goodbye", and "Is There Anybody Here But Me?" (Pessis, Wells), a smooth mid-tempo number.

Branigan recorded a duet with David Hasselhoff which was hugely successful for being broadcast as the closing track of the Baywatch TV series. The single I Believe was originally released on CD album in 1994.

After 1990, Branigan's chart success cooled in the U.S., though she was still in demand around the world and went on several global tours. In 1994, not long after the release of Over My Heart, Larry Kruteck, Branigan's husband (m. 1978), was diagnosed with colon cancer. Branigan refused to accept the medical prognosis, and left the music industry to devote her attention to him. Branigan put Kruteck on herbal treatments, eventually nursing him full-time. Kruteck survived for another two and a half years and died on June 15, 1996, after which Branigan stopped performing.

Branigan had official greatest hits collections released in South America, Japan, Germany, South Africa, and the U.S.; the U.S. collection was released in 1995. The 13-track The Best of Branigan included two newly recorded covers: "Show Me Heaven" (written by Maria McKee) and the Donna Summer hit "Dim All the Lights", which Branigan released in several remixes.
On August 15, 1995, Branigan was a guest on the TV show Talking Food, hosted by Robin Leach and broadcast by the Food Network, and she promoted the album and sang "Dim All the Lights", before preparing her Summer Delight pasta dish on the show.

Besides her duties as a jury member of this international musical competition, Branigan performed on February 16 on the main stage for an audience who enthusiastically sang her greatest hits.

2001–2004: Return to music
In early 2001, Branigan's return to the stage was postponed, when she broke both of her femurs in a 10-foot fall from a ladder while she was hanging wisteria outside her three-bedroom lakeside home in Westchester County, New York, resulting in physical therapy for six months. In 2002, she performed twice as the "singing" Janis Joplin in the off-Broadway musical Love, Janis, before dropping out of the show. "I left Janis because the producers failed to file with Equity properly," she told the Sunday News in Lancaster, Pennsylvania. "I was sort of relieved. My voice isn't anything like Janis Joplin's, and there were 19 of her songs in the show." In later years she continued to record, and dated Tommy Bayiokos, the drummer in her band. Also in 2002, her second official US hits collection, The Essentials, was released, including the long out-of-print hit "I Found Someone".

Death
Branigan died in her sleep at her lodge in East Quogue, New York, on August 26, 2004, aged 52. The cause was attributed to a previously undiagnosed cerebral aneurysm. It was reported that she had been experiencing persistent headaches for several weeks before her death, but had sought no medical attention for them. At the time of her death, it was widely and erroneously reported that she was 47 years old, resulting from a technical error the Associated Press published after contacting Branigan's management company.

Branigan was cremated, and her ashes were scattered over Long Island Sound.

Legacy
At Byram Hills High School in Armonk, New York, the Laura Branigan Memorial Scholarship is given annually to a senior for excellence in the performing arts.

On April 18, 2019, Jain debuted a single titled "Gloria" that is not a cover, but a tribute to Branigan.

"Play Gloria" association with St. Louis Blues
The St. Louis Blues NHL team began using Branigan's version of "Gloria" as its unofficial victory song when they went on a franchise-record 11-game winning streak during the 2018–19 season. A few Blues players visited a bar in South Philadelphia called Jacks NYB to watch the NFL Wild Card game between the Philadelphia Eagles and Chicago Bears.

At the time, the Blues had the worst record in the league at 15–18–4, had fired head coach Mike Yeo, called up rookie goaltender Jordan Binnington from the minor leagues to replace struggling starter Jake Allen, and seemed bound for a lost season. Following their January 7 victory over the Flyers, which was Binnington's first NHL start, the Blues played "Gloria" in the locker room to celebrate their victory, with it then becoming a regular locker room ritual. When their stadium's DJ learned of it, he began playing the song in the stadium to rally the team. From January 2019 the Blues would post a 30-10-5 record in the remaining games to finish at 45-28-9 and qualify for a playoff spot, eventually advancing to the 2019 Stanley Cup Finals, the teams' first Stanley Cup Final since 1970, where they defeated the Boston Bruins in 7 games to win their first Stanley Cup in franchise history. The dramatic turnaround in the Blues' fortunes following their adoption of "Gloria" led to it being embraced as their new victory anthem. The song is played at Enterprise Center every time the Blues win a game, leading to "Play Gloria!" becoming both a meme and victory chant for Blues fans. Local radio station Y98 played the song for 24 hours following the Blues' Game 7 double-overtime 2–1 victory over the Dallas Stars on May 8 and again two weeks later on May 22 after its Game 6 5–1 win over the San Jose Sharks to win the Western Conference Championship and advance to the finals. After the Blues defeated the Boston Bruins in the Stanley Cup Finals, on June 12, Y98 played "Gloria" again for 24 hours. The bands Phish and Vampire Weekend, who were both holding concerts in St. Louis on the night of Game 7, performed covers of "Gloria" when they learned the Blues had won the Cup.

Branigan's legacy manager and representative Kathy Golik has embraced the trend, with Branigan's verified Twitter page frequently posting support for the Blues, especially during their 2019 playoff run. Branigan's official website also got updated with a new splash page which expressed support for the Blues and proclaimed Branigan as the "Original Play Gloria". Golik stayed in St. Louis and attended every game and watch party during the Blues' 2019 Stanley Cup run as Branigan's representative among the Blues fanbase while discussing the trend with media outlets. When fans of the Boston Bruins, the Blues' opponent in the 2019 Stanley Cup Finals, started re-purposing the "Play Gloria" meme it earned a rebuke from Branigan's Twitter page which went viral. Custom-made Blues jerseys with Branigan's name and the number 82 surged in popularity during the 2019 Stanley Cup playoffs, with one being displayed on Branigan's Twitter page, along with other Blues merchandise sent by fans. "Gloria" reappeared on the iTunes singles chart thanks to the trend, going to number 3 after the Blues won the Stanley Cup. "Gloria" would also re-enter the Billboard charts in the wake of the Blues' championship, landing at No. 46 on the Billboard Digital Song Sales chart for the week of June 22, 2019. Golik noted that streams of "Gloria" have surged across all platforms and this has had a "trickle down" effect to the rest of Branigan's catalog, with her other hit songs such as "Self Control", "Solitaire" and "How Am I Supposed to Live Without You" seeing significant upticks in streams and downloads during the 2019 Stanley Cup Playoffs. The song's resurgence in popularity has led to Branigan's management getting numerous requests for live performances and public appearances, leading them to release a statement reminding the public that Branigan is deceased, as well as adding a note about this to her social media accounts. Forbes described "Gloria" as an "unlikely championship anthem" and noted that the Blues' Stanley Cup victory could permanently alter the meaning and legacy of the song, with it becoming forever associated with the St. Louis Blues and ice hockey in general. Golik has also stated her belief that Branigan and "Gloria" "will forever be intertwined" with the Blues and the city of St. Louis. When asked how she thought Branigan would have reacted to the "Play Gloria" meme had she lived to see it, Golik said, "She was very sincere, very down to Earth, she would just have been very touched by it all. If she were here, I know she would have participated in a very big way. I know she's there in spirit. To see them win and to hear that song blaring and coming up in the arena and looking around and seeing people singing out as loud as they can, cheering and having a good time, it's indescribable what that's like."
In addition, Branigan's boyfriend at the time of her passing Tommy Bayiokos, who also was in her band, said "Laura would have gladly satisfied fans' desire to hear it live.  She would have been humbled and performed with gusto. The "Play Gloria" wave started at the Jacks NYB bar and was totally UNSCRIPTED,...it's been bittersweet and a testament of Laura's musical prowess."

Discography

Studio albums
 Branigan (1982)
 Branigan 2 (1983)
 Self Control (1984)
 Hold Me (1985)
 Touch (1987)
 Laura Branigan (1990)
 Over My Heart (1993)

Filmography

Awards and nominations

‡ This nomination was not given to Laura Branigan alone.

Notes

References

External links

 
 
 
 

1952 births
2004 deaths
20th-century American actresses
20th-century American women singers
20th-century American singers
21st-century American women singers
21st-century American singers
Actresses from New York (state)
Age controversies
American Academy of Dramatic Arts alumni
American women pop singers
American film actresses
American people of Irish descent
American stage actresses
American television actresses
Atlantic Records artists
Ballad musicians
Neurological disease deaths in New York (state)
Deaths from intracranial aneurysm
American women rock singers
People from Armonk, New York
People from East Quogue, New York
Singers from New York (state)